Rufer may refer to:

People
 Adam Rufer (born 1991), Czech ice hockey player
 Alex Rufer (born 1996), New Zealand football player
 Josef Rufer (1893–1985), Austrian-born musicologist
 Rudy Rufer (1926–2010), American baseball player
 Shane Rufer (born 1960), New Zealand football player
 Wynton Rufer (born 1962), New Zealand football player

Places
 Rufer House, Vienna

Other
 Der Rufer
 Roofer